The Regimiento Hibernia ("Regiment of Hibernia") was one of the Spanish army's foreign regiments (Infantería de línea extranjera). Known by many in Spain as "O'Neill's Regiment", it was formed in 1709 from Irishmen who fled their own country in the wake of the Flight of the Earls and the penal laws and who became known as the Wild Geese - a name which has become synonymous in modern times for Irish mercenaries and soldiers throughout the world.

Although the Wild Geese are more associated with the French Army and are indeed seen as the precursors of the French Foreign Legion the regiment of Hibernia was one of many Irish regiments to serve in the Spanish army. The Wild Geese began fighting for Spain during the Eighty Years' War. The first Irish units in the service of Spain were formed in 1587 as the Tercio Irlanda ("Irish Brigade"), formed from defectors from the English army.

Due to the number of wars Spain was involved in during the early 18th century the country could not provide itself with enough soldiers for its own campaigns. This was also exacerbated by the severe loss of manpower as a result of a plague epidemic.  Diplomatic approaches were made to a number of countries with requests for the recruitment of mercenaries to fight for Spain. Swiss, Germans, Italians and Walloons were recruited but the Spanish were particularly keen to engage Irishmen because of their reputation as soldiers.  The Confederation of Kilkenny established licences for the recruitment of Irishmen to fight for the King of Spain.

The Irish regiments in Spanish service were disbanded in 1818 at the request of their British allies.

Uniform
The Irish regiments, as foreign troops, wore the same red jacket as the Swiss and Neapolitan troops in their service - except they had green facings. This was worn with an athwart (worn sideways) black bicorne hat for all ranks; enlisted men wore a red plume and officers wore a red cockade and fringed epaulets. Their regimental symbol was the Arms of Ireland - a gold harp on a sky blue field.

In 1806 the uniform was changed to a sky-blue coatee with yellow lining, turnbacks and trim worn with a white vest and breeches, perhaps to differentiate them from their red-coated British allies. Regimiento Irlanda (the "Irish Regiment" cr.1698) had a yellow collar and lapels and gold buttons, Regimiento Hibernia (the "Hibernian Regiment" cr.1709) had a sky blue collar, yellow lapels and silver buttons, and Regimiento Ultonia (the "Ulster Regiment" cr.1709) had a yellow collar, sky blue lapels and silver buttons.

Campaigns and battles
One remarkable facet of so many Irishmen fighting for opposing nations in Europe was that they occasionally faced each other as enemies on foreign battlefields. The Hibernia Regiment found itself in this position at the siege of Badajoz, in 1811,  when they faced the Irish Legion under the command of the French.

Battle of Zaragoza (1710)
Battle of Brihuega
Battle of Villaviciosa
Siege of Barcelona (1714)
Siege of Gibraltar
Ceuta (1720–1721)
Brazil (1777)
Jamaica (1780)
Battle of Pensacola (1781)
Third Siege of Girona (1809)

Notables
General Don Alejandro "Bloody" O'Reilly
The Marquess of Lede
Patrick Lawless
Arturo O'Neill
John Sherlock

References

External links
 Irish and Scottish Military Migration to Spain

Bibliography
Irish Brigades Abroad, Stephen McGarry
The Spanish Monarchy and Irish Mercenaries.- The Wild Geese in Spain 1618-68. (R.A. Stradling)
The Irish Brigades in the Service of France, J.C. O'Callaghan.
The Wild Geese, M. Hennessy
The March of O'Sullivan Beare, L.J. Emerson.
The O' Neills in Spain, Spanish Knights of Irish Origin, Destruction by Peace, Micheline Kerney Walsh. The Irish Sword, Vol 4-11
The Wild Geese, Mark G. McLaughlin.
Wild Geese in Spanish Flanders, 1582–1700, B. Jennings.
Spain under the Habsburgs, John Lynch
The Flight of the Earls, John McCavitt

 
Irish regiments in European armies
Infantry regiments of Spain
O'Neill dynasty